Werner Plath (27 July 1918 – 1945) was a German swimmer who competed in the 1936 Summer Olympics. He was born in Berlin. He was executed during World War II.

References

1918 births
1945 deaths
Swimmers from Berlin
German male swimmers
German male freestyle swimmers
Olympic swimmers of Germany
Swimmers at the 1936 Summer Olympics
European Aquatics Championships medalists in swimming
People from Berlin executed by Nazi Germany
20th-century German people